Matteo Bruni (born 23 November 1976) is an Italian-British media professional who serves as director of the Holy See Press Office of the Roman Curia. He was appointed on 18 July 2019 by Pope Francis, succeeding Greg Burke. He is the first non-journalist to hold the office.

Biography
Matteo Bruni, who was born in 1976 in Winchester, England, holds a degree in foreign languages and literature from La Sapienza University in Rome. He joined the Press Office in 2009 to manage journalist accreditations. Since 2013 he has been responsible for communications during papal travels, before being appointed Director of the Holy See Press Office in 2019 by Pope Francis. 

He speaks English, Italian, French and Spanish. He has been a member of the Community of Sant’Egidio, a Catholic lay association committed to social service, since he was a teenager. He is married and has a daughter.

He announced the death of Pope Emeritus Benedict XVI on 31 December 2022.

References

1976 births
Living people
British Catholics
British people of Italian descent
British translators
Members of the Secretariat for Communication
Officials of the Roman Curia